Kimbanguism is a Christian new religious movement professed by the Church of Jesus Christ on Earth by His special envoy Simon Kimbangu founded by Simon Kimbangu in the Belgian Congo (today the Democratic Republic of the Congo) in 1921. It is considered a sectarian branch of Christianity. A large, independent African-initiated church, it has an estimated 6 million believers and has its headquarters in Nkamba, Kongo Central. The denomination became a member of the World Council of Churches, the All Africa Conference of Churches, and the Organization of African Instituted Churches. In June 2021 the World Council of Churches withdrew membership on doctrinal grounds.

History 

In April 1921, Kimbangu, a Baptist mission catechist, inaugurated a mass movement through his supposed miraculous healings and biblical teaching. His teachings attracted working people, who left jobs to hear him speak about liberation. This threatened the colonial labor structure and thus the Belgian regime. The Belgian authorities treated the faith with suspicion and imprisoned Simon Kimbangu until his death in 1951. The church was formally recognised by the Belgian colonial authorities in 1959.

Some smaller, more loosely organised groups in Central Africa regard Kimbangu as God's prophet.

Life and works of Kimbangu
According to the church,  Simon Kimbangu is said to have come down to Earth from Mount Zion as a Congolese infant. His father had been a traditional religious leader, but both parents died and Kimbangu was orphaned and put in the care of his maternal aunt.  She took him to Baptist missionary school where he studied for many years. He grew up to be a Baptist.

Beliefs and practices 

The church eschews politics and embraces Puritan ethics, rejecting the use of violence, polygamy, magic and witchcraft, alcohol, tobacco, and dancing. Its worship is Baptist in form, though the Eucharist was not introduced until 1971.

The three key dates in the Kimbanguist calendar are 6 April (marking the date of the start of the ministry of healing), 25 May (marking Christmas, falling on the birthday of Father Dialungana), and 12 October (Kimbangu's death anniversary). The church is largely non-sacramental, with large services that are well-organised.

The church also believes that Father Simon Kimbangu is the Holy Spirit, in accordance with John 14:15–17. Like many Christian groups, the Kimbanguists begin and end prayers with the Trinitarian formula.

Alongside Simon Kimbangu, the Trinity are Father Kisolokele (first son of Kimbangu) as God the Father, Father Salomon Diangani Dialungana (the reincarnated Jesus and second son of Kimbangu), Father Diangienda Kuntima (last son, reincarnation of Kimbangu and second human form of the Holy Spirit), and Father Simon Kimbangu Kiangani (grandson of Kimbangu, third human form of the Holy Spirit, and current spiritual leader of the Church since 2001). 

The doctrinal status given by this church to Simon Kimbangu has led to international controversy as contrary to the doctrine of the Trinity and therefore heretical. In 2021 the church’s membership of the World Council of Churches (WCC) was discontinued by the Central Committee of the WCC on theological grounds.

Hierarchy
The spiritual head (Diangienda)
Adjunct spiritual heads (Dialungana and Kisolokele – the other sons of Simon Kimbangu)
Bansadisi (healers)
Legal representatives of churches in the various countries
Regional representatives and their staffs
Subregional representatives and their staffs
Main parish ministers, evangelists and helpers
Parish-section ministers, evangelists and helpers
Congregants

See also
Mandombe script
Simon-Pierre Mpadi
Bundu dia Kongo

References

Further reading
 Kimbangu: An African Prophet and His Church Marie-Louise Martin (Grand Rapids, MI: Eerdmans Publishing Company, 1976)

External links
 
 Official Website (mostly in French, some German)
 Orchestre Symphonique Kimbanguiste (in French)
 Kimbangu resource (in French)

African initiated churches
Christian organizations established in 1921
Christian new religious movements
Christian denominations in the Democratic Republic of the Congo
1921 establishments in the Belgian Congo
Members of the World Council of Churches
All Africa Conference of Churches